Middle Falbrook is a locality in the Singleton Council region of New South Wales, Australia.

Middle Falbrook Public School operated from November 1889 until July 1937. It was renamed Glennies Creek Public School in August 1927, and was known by that name until its closure.

Heritage listings
Middle Falbrook has a number of heritage-listed sites, including:
 Rixs Creek-Falbrook Road: Glennies Creek bridge

References

Localities in New South Wales
Suburbs of Singleton Council